Hocaköy can refer to the following villages in Turkey:

 Hocaköy, Akseki
 Hocaköy, Azdavay
 Hocaköy, İnegöl
 Hocaköy, İznik
 Hocaköy, Kastamonu
 Hocaköy, Taşköprü
 Hocaköy, Ulus
 Hocaköy, Yığılca